This article lists the winners and nominees for the NAACP Image Award for Outstanding Supporting Actress in a Motion Picture. The award was introduced in 1970 and was awarded sporadically until its permanent feature from 1995 onwards. Angela Bassett currently holds the record for most wins in this category, with four.

Winners and nominees
For each year in the tables below, the winner is listed first and highlighted in bold.

1970s

1980s

1990s

2000s

2010s

2020s

Multiple wins and nominations

Wins

 4 wins
 Angela Bassett

 2 wins
 Loretta Devine
 Whoopi Goldberg
 Regina King
 Alfre Woodard

Nominations

 7 nominations
 Alfre Woodard
 Angela Bassett

 5 nominations
 Loretta Devine
 Octavia Spencer

 4 nominations
 Whoopi Goldberg
 Queen Latifah
 Thandiwe Newton
 Lupita Nyong'o
 Phylicia Rashad

 3 nominations
 Kimberly Elise
 Taraji P. Henson
 Jennifer Hudson
 Regina King
 Mo'Nique
 Jada Pinkett Smith
 Anika Noni Rose
 Cicely Tyson

 2 nominations
 Nicole Ari Parker
 Viola Davis
 Danai Gurira
 Regina Hall
 Sanaa Lathan
 Jenifer Lewis
 Janelle Monáe
 Sophie Okonedo
 Jill Scott
 Regina Taylor
 Kerry Washington
 Oprah Winfrey

References

NAACP Image Awards
Film awards for supporting actress